"It's Christmas Time" is a Christmas song recorded by the British Rock band Status Quo in 2008. It was included in the compilation box set album Pictures - 40 Years of Hits. The single was released on 8 December 2008 and it was written by Rick Parfitt and Wayne Morris.

The song was released as a digital download, CD and 7 inch vinyl.

Track listing 
 "It's Christmas Time" (4:10)	
 "Pictures of Matchstick Men" / "Ice in the Sun" [Live] (4:38)
 "It's Christmas Time" [Quo-eoke Mix] (4:12)

Charts

References 

Status Quo (band) songs
2008 singles
British Christmas songs
Songs written by Rick Parfitt
2008 songs
Universal Music Group singles